Wachera Piyapattra (born 20 September 1960) is a Thai archer. He competed in the men's individual event at the 1984 Summer Olympics. He placed 50th, and did not advance beyond the qualifying round.

References

1960 births
Living people
Wachera Piyapattra
Wachera Piyapattra
Archers at the 1984 Summer Olympics
Place of birth missing (living people)